Events in the year 2017 in Nigeria.

Incumbents

Federal government
 President: Muhammadu Buhari (APC)
 Vice President: Yemi Osinbajo (APC)
 Senate President: Bukola Saraki (APC)
 House Speaker: Yakubu Dogara (APC)
 Chief Justice: Walter Samuel Nkanu Onnoghen (Starting 7 March)

Governors
 Abia State: Okezie Ikpeazu (PDP) 
 Adamawa State: Bindo Jibrilla (APC) 
 Akwa Ibom State: Udom Emmanuel (PDP) 
 Anambra State: Willie Obiano (APGA)
 Bauchi State: M. A. Abubakar (APC)
 Bayelsa State: Henry Dickson (PDP)
 Benue State: Samuel Ortom (APC)
 Borno State: Kashim Shettima (APC)
 Cross River State: Ben Ayade (PDP) 
 Delta State: Ifeanyi Okowa (PDP) 
 Ebonyi State: Dave Umahi (PDP)
 Edo State: Godwin Obaseki (PDP) 
 Ekiti State: Ayo Fayose (PDP)
 Enugu State: Ifeanyi Ugwuanyi (PDP) 
 Gombe State: Ibrahim Dankwambo (PDP)
 Imo State: Rochas Okorocha (APC)
 Jigawa State: Badaru Abubakar (APC)
 Kaduna State: Nasir el-Rufai (APC) 
 Kano State: Umar Ganduje (APC) 
 Katsina State: Aminu Masari (APC) 
 Kebbi State: Abubakar Atiku Bagudu (APC)
 Kogi State: Yahaya Bello (APC)
 Kwara State: Abdulfatah Ahmed (APC)
 Lagos State: Akinwumi Ambode (APC) 
 Nasarawa State: Umaru Al-Makura (APC)
 Niger State: Abubakar Sani Bello (APC) 
 Ogun State: Ibikunle Amosun (APC)
 Ondo State: Olusegun Mimiko (LP) (until 24 February); Rotimi Akeredolu (APC) (starting 24 February)
 Osun State: Rauf Aregbesola (APC)
 Oyo State: Abiola Ajimobi (APC)
 Plateau State: Simon Lalong (APC) 
 Rivers State: Ezenwo Nyesom Wike (PDP)
 Sokoto State: Aminu Tambuwal (APC) 
 Taraba State: Darius Ishaku (PDP) 
 Yobe State: Ibrahim Geida (APC)
 Zamfara State: Abdul-aziz Yari Abubakar (APC)

Events

13 January – Governor Ezenwo Nyesom Wike of Rivers State signs ₦470 billion budget into law.
17 January – Rann bombing, resulting in 115 deaths according to official sources.

Deaths

8 January – Abdulkadir Kure, politician (b. 1956)
16 January – William Onyeabor, singer-songwriter (b. 1946)
28 January – Mohammed Bello Abubakar, Muslim preacher and polygamist (b. 1924)
26 April – Babalola Borishade, politician (b. 1946)
4 June – Babatunde Osotimehin, physician and politician (b. 1949) 
21 June – Kelechi Emeteole, footballer (b. 1951)
11 August – Segun Bucknor, musician and journalist (b. 1946)

See also
List of Nigerian films of 2017

References

 
2010s in Nigeria
Years of the 21st century in Nigeria
Nigeria
Nigeria